Bert Allen (1883–1911) was an English footballer who played in the Football League for Aston Villa and Chesterfield Town.

References

1883 births
1911 deaths
English footballers
Association football forwards
English Football League players
Aston Villa F.C. players
Chesterfield F.C. players
Kidderminster Harriers F.C. players
Stafford Rangers F.C. players